"Cry" is the second and final single from English singer-songwriter Alex Parks' debut album, Introduction (2003). The song was released on 16 February 2004, peaking at number 13 on the UK Singles Chart and number 32 on the Irish Singles Chart.

Music video
In the video, Parks is in a London Underground station listening to music, waiting for the train to come. There are also scenes showing her on a beach. Towards the end of the song, she gets off the train and starts running, as does the Alex on the beach. At the end of the song, she is seen walking away.

Track listings
UK CD1
 "Cry" (album version)  
 "Maybe That's What It Takes" (acoustic)  
 "Wandering Soul" (acoustic)  
 "Cry" (video)  
 "Maybe That's What It Takes" (video)

UK CD2
 "Cry" (album version)  
 "Chasing the Blue"

Charts

References

External links
 UKMIX - CRY single reviews

2003 songs
2004 singles
Alex Parks songs
Polydor Records singles
Songs written by Alex Parks
Songs written by Boo Hewerdine
Songs written by Gary Clark (musician)